Whittington is a civil parish in the district of Lichfield, Staffordshire, England.  It contains 19 buildings that are recorded in the National Heritage List for England.  Of these, one is listed at Grade II*, the middle of the three grades, and the others are at Grade II, the lowest grade.  The parish contains the villages of Whittington and Huddlesford and the surrounding countryside.  Most of the listed buildings are houses and associated structures, cottages, farmhouses and farm buildings.  In the parish is Whittington Barracks, and the listed buildings here are the keep, a garrison church, and two war memorials.  The Coventry Canal and the Birmingham and Fazeley Canal pass through the parish, and a bridge over each of these is listed.  The other listed buildings are a church, a memorial in the churchyard, a former school, and another war memorial.


Key

Buildings

References

Citations

Sources

Lists of listed buildings in Staffordshire